The 2016–17 Ugandan Super League was the 50th season of top-flight football in Uganda. The season began on 19 August 2016. Kampala Capital City Authority FC (KCCA) won their second consecutive league title and 12th overall with two weeks to spare.

Teams
The league consisted of 16 teams with Kirinya-Jinja SSS FC, Onduparaka FC, and Proline FC being promoted from the 2015-16 FUFA Big League. Maroons FC, SC Victoria University, and Simba FC were relegated after finishing in the bottom three spots in 2015–16.

Stadiums and locations

League table

Positions by round

Season statistics

Goals

Top scorers

Hat-tricks

Scoring
First goal of the season: Joseph Ochaya for KCCA against JMC Hippos (19 August 2016)

References

Ugandan Super League seasons
Uganda Super League
Super League